Foolish Pleasure (March 23, 1972 – November 17, 1994) was an American bay Thoroughbred race horse who won the 1975 Kentucky Derby.

Background
Foolish Pleasure was a bay horse bred at Williston, Florida by Waldemar Farms, Inc. He was owned by John L. Greer and trained by LeRoy Jolley, who had previously been partners in the colt Ridan. He was sired by What A Pleasure, who won the Hopeful Stakes in 1967 before becoming a successful breeding stallion. His dam, Fool-Me-Not, was descended from the British broodmare Becti (foaled 1929), who was the female-line ancestor of many major winners including Mrs McArdy, Borgia, and Boreal.

Racing career
Foolish Pleasure was undefeated as a two-year-old. In 1975, at age three, he won the Flamingo Stakes and Wood Memorial Stakes before contesting the Kentucky Derby. Ridden by Jacinto Vásquez, he raced well off the pace on the inside before making a forward move approaching the final turn. He was switched to the outside in the straight and produced a strong late burst to win from Avatar.

Although heavily favored to win, Foolish Pleasure finished second to Master Derby in the Preakness. He then finished runner-up to Avatar in the Belmont Stakes.

In July 1975, a match race was arranged between Foolish Pleasure and the unbeaten filly Ruffian. Vásquez chose to ride Ruffian, with Braulio Baeza taking over on Foolish Pleasure. While on the lead, Ruffian broke down, allowing Foolish Pleasure to win unchallenged.

Foolish Pleasure remained in training as a four-year-old and won the Donn Handicap and Suburban Handicap.

Retirement
Foolish Pleasure was placed at Greentree Stud after being syndicated for $4.5 million USD. He later spent time at Mint Lane Farm and Spendthrift Farm in Kentucky before being moved out to Kerr Stock Farm in California. He was purchased by Ron Vanderhoef in September 1993 and moved to Horseshoe Ranch in Dayton, Wyoming, where he remained until he died from a gastric rupture on November 17, 1994.

Foolish Pleasure was inducted into the National Museum of Racing and Hall of Fame in 1995. In the Blood Horse magazine ranking of the top 100 U.S. thoroughbred champions of the 20th Century, he was ranked #97.

Pedigree

Foolish Pleasure was inbred 4 × 4 to Blenheim, meaning that this stallion appears twice in the fourth generation of his pedigree.

References

1972 racehorse births
1994 racehorse deaths
Kentucky Derby winners
Racehorses bred in Florida
American Grade 1 Stakes winners
United States Thoroughbred Racing Hall of Fame inductees
Thoroughbred family 14-b